Benvenuto Cellini (1500–1571) was an Italian goldsmith, painter, sculptor, soldier and musician of the Renaissance.

Cellini may also refer to:

 Cellini (play), a 2001 play by John Patrick Shanley
 Cellini (surname)
 Cellini (horse)
 Cellini (apple), see Laxton's Superb